Juan Carlos Arana Gómez (born 8 February 2000) is a Spanish footballer who plays as a forward for SD Eibar.

Club career
Born in Las Palmas, Canary Islands, Arana joined Real Madrid's La Fábrica in July 2012, from UD Las Palmas. In April 2016, he moved to rivals Atlético Madrid, but left the latter after four months and returned to his first team CF Unión Viera.

Shortly after returning to Unión Viera, Arana made his first team debut for the side in Tercera División. On 13 June 2017, he signed for Villarreal CF and returned to the youth setup.

Arana played for the first team of CD Roda in 2018, before appearing for Villarreal's C-team in the following year. On 4 September 2020, after already starting to appear with the reserves, he renewed his contract until 2023.

On 3 November 2021, Arana further extended his deal until 2024, and finished the season with 16 goals as the B-side achieved promotion to Segunda División. He made his professional debut with the B's on 14 August 2022, starting and scoring the second in a 2–0 away win over Racing de Santander.

On 5 January 2023, Arana signed a two-and-a-half-year contract with SD Eibar also in the second division.

References

External links
Real Madrid profile 

2000 births
Living people
Spanish footballers
Footballers from Las Palmas
Association football forwards
Segunda División players
Primera Federación players
Segunda División B players
Tercera División players
Villarreal CF C players
Villarreal CF B players
SD Eibar footballers